Carex schweinitzii, common name Schweinitz's sedge, is a Carex species native to North America. It is a perennial.

Description

Its ligules are wider than long. Its peduncles are short, and its male spikelets are solitary while its female spikelets are spreading and erect.

Habitat

Carex schweinitzii occurs most often in calcium-rich soils near water, such as in springheads, springy seeps, and wet ground along cold spring-fed streams. More rarely the plant occurs in mixed or coniferous cover and even in the open. The plant is mostly local but is abundant where it is found.

Conservation status in the United States
It is listed as endangered in Connecticut, Massachusetts, North Carolina, Pennsylvania, and Wisconsin. It is listed as threatened in New York and historical in Rhode Island.

References

schweinitzii